Boyds Creek is an unincorporated community in Sevier County, Tennessee, United States. It is named for a small southward-flowing tributary of the French Broad River of the same name, which itself derives its name from a Virginian trader, killed by a band of Cherokee people, whose body was thrown into the stream. The creek was the site of a 1780 battle (The Battle of Boyd's Creek) between white settlers and Cherokee angry at the settlers' encroachment onto their hunting territory.

Geography
The community has a mean elevation of 899 feet (274 metres).

References 

Unincorporated communities in Sevier County, Tennessee
Unincorporated communities in Tennessee
18th century Cherokee history